Lafayette Lawrence Gould Jr. (April 28, 1893 – February 1972) was an American Negro league outfielder in the 1910s.

A native of Philadelphia, Pennsylvania, Gould played for the Bacharach Giants in 1917. He died in Philadelphia in 1972 at age 78.

References

External links
Baseball statistics and player information from Baseball-Reference Black Baseball Stats and Seamheads

1893 births
1972 deaths
Bacharach Giants players
Baseball outfielders
Baseball players from Philadelphia
20th-century African-American sportspeople